The El Gouna International is an annual men's and women's squash tournament held in El Gouna, Egypt in April. It is part of the PSA World Series, the highest level of professional squash competition. The men's event was first held in 2010 while the women's event was first held in 2018.

Past results

Men's

Women's

See also
 Squash in Egypt
 Alexandria International

References

External links
- Official website
- PSA El Gouna International 2012

Squash tournaments in Egypt
Squash in Egypt
Recurring sporting events established in 2010